Philip James Selway (born 23 May 1967) is an English musician and the drummer of the English rock band Radiohead. Along with the other members of Radiohead, he was inducted into the Rock and Roll Hall of Fame in 2019.

Selway released his debut solo album, Familial, in 2010, followed by Weatherhouse in 2014 and Strange Dance in 2023. He also composed the soundtrack for the 2017 film Let Me Go. In 2023, he played drums with the band Lanterns on the Lake.

Early life
Selway was born on 23 May, 1967, in Abingdon, Oxfordshire. He started learning to play drums and guitar at the age of 15 for "the social cachet and love of music". His earliest influences were Joy Division, the Clash and the Velvet Underground.

The members of Radiohead met while attending Abingdon School, a private school for boys. Selway, along with the guitarist Ed O'Brien, was in the year above the singer Thom Yorke and the bassist Colin Greenwood, and three years above Colin's brother, the multi-instrumentalist Jonny Greenwood. In 1985, they formed , the name referring to their usual rehearsal day in the school's music room. 

After Abingdon, Selway studied English and history at Liverpool Polytechnic. He also worked as a TEFL teacher, a copyeditor, and as a drummer in pit bands for touring musicals.

Career

Radiohead 

In 1991, On a Friday signed a recording contract with EMI and changed their name to Radiohead. They found early success with their 1992 single "Creep". Their third album, OK Computer (1997), brought them international fame and is often acclaimed as one of the best albums of all time.

From their fourth album, Kid A (2000), Radiohead began integrating drum machines and electronic percussion into their music. Selway said this "pushed me to create some new dynamics. It's another way of solving the problem of arranging songs ... Electronics opened up my drumming rather than closing down the possibilities of what I can do. Now I can express myself in a more effective way." In 2008, Gigwise named Selway the 26th-greatest drummer of all time, praising his "mathematical precision". 

Since 2011, Radiohead have performed with a second drummer, Clive Deamer. Describing their 2012 tour for The King of Limbs, Selway said: "One [of us] played in the traditional way, the other almost mimicked a drum machine. It was push-and-pull, like kids at play, really interesting."

By 2011, Radiohead had sold more than 30 million albums worldwide. They were inducted into the Rock and Roll Hall of Fame in March 2019; Selway and O'Brien attended the induction ceremony and gave speeches. Selway said, "We may not be the greatest musicians around and we're certainly not the most media-friendly of bands. But we have become very adept at being Radiohead. And when that connects with people, it feels amazing." 

Selway contributed drums to "Impossible Knots" from Yorke's third solo album, Anima (2019). In 2019, Selway testified at an inquest into the 2012 Radiohead stage collapse that killed his drum technician, Scott Johnson.

Solo work 
Selway wrote songs as a teenager, but concentrated on drumming after forming Radiohead. He began writing again later in life, and decided to record solo as he felt the songs had a distinct character that did not fit Radiohead.

Selway's debut solo album, Familial, was released on 30 August 2010. It features Selway on acoustic guitar and vocals, and performances from the Wilco members Glenn Kotche and Pat Sansone and the 7 Worlds Collide artists Lisa Germano and Sebastian Steinberg. Pitchfork described it as a collection of "hushed" folk songs in the tradition of Nick Drake. Selway announced a solo tour on 4 February 2011.

Selway's second solo album, Weatherhouse, was released on 6 October 2014, featuring more ambitious instrumentation and electronic elements. In 2017, Selway composed the score for the feature film Let Me Go, directed by Polly Steele. His third solo album, Strange Dance, was released on 24 February 2023. He chose not to drum on the album, finding he was out of practice and "not in the right mindset", and enlisted the Italian drummer Valentina Magaletti.

Other work 

Selway is a supporter of the emotional support charity Samaritans, with which he became involved while a university student. He volunteered as a telephone listener for years, including at the height of Radiohead's success, saying it "probably kept my sanity in that period". He is also an ambassador for Independent Venue Week, an initiative that promotes small music venues.

Selway performed with the band Dive Dive in March 2005. Along with Radiohead guitarist Jonny Greenwood and Pulp singer Jarvis Cocker, Selway appeared in the 2005 film Harry Potter and the Goblet of Fire as a member of the band the Weird Sisters.

Selway toured and recorded with Neil Finn as part of the 7 Worlds Collide project. He drummed on their 2001 live album and provided drums, guitar and vocals on their 2009 studio album The Sun Came Out, where he also penned two tracks.

Selway appears on "Rest on the Rock" and "Out of Light" on the album Before the Ruin by Roddy Woomble, Kris Drever, and John McCusker. He played drums and percussion on the fifth album by Lanterns on the Lake, Versions of Us (2023).

Personal life 
Selway and his wife Cait have three sons and a daughter. Selway's mother Thea died in May 2006; Radiohead cancelled a concert in Amsterdam so that Selway could carry out his family duties. They returned to Amsterdam in August to play the missed show. Radiohead's 2007 album In Rainbows was dedicated to Thea Selway. As of 2023, Selway had recently moved to London.

Discography

Studio albums

Soundtrack albums

Extended plays

Singles

See also
 List of Old Abingdonians

Notes

References

External links
 – official site

1967 births
Art rock musicians
Alumni of Liverpool John Moores University
English rock drummers
People educated at Abingdon School
People from Abingdon-on-Thames
Radiohead members
Ivor Novello Award winners
English folk guitarists
English male guitarists
English electronic musicians
Musicians from Oxfordshire
Alternative rock drummers
Grammy Award winners
Living people
Bella Union artists
Teachers of English